Charles Joseph Pierpoint (born 1 September 1795 at Lindfield, Sussex; details of death unknown) was an English amateur cricketer who played first-class cricket from 1825 to 1827.  He was mainly associated with Sussex, and he made 4 known appearances in first-class matches.

References

External links

Bibliography
 Arthur Haygarth, Scores & Biographies, Volume 1-2 (1744–1840), Lillywhite, 1862

1795 births
Date of death unknown
English cricketers
English cricketers of 1787 to 1825
English cricketers of 1826 to 1863
Sussex cricketers
People from Lindfield, West Sussex
Year of death missing